The 12843 / 12844 Puri–Ahmedabad Express is a Superfast Express train of Indian Railways – East Coast Railways zone that runs between  and  in India.

It operates as train number 12843 from Puri to Ahmedabad Junction and as train number 12844 in the reverse direction, serving the states of Odisha, Andhra Pradesh, Chhattisgarh, Maharashtra & Gujarat.

Coaches

The 12843/44 Puri–Ahmedabad Express presently has 1 AC 2 tier, 3 AC 3 tier, 9 Sleeper class, 7 Second Class seating & 2 SLR (Seating cum Luggage Rake) coaches.

As with most train services in India, coach composition may be amended at the discretion of Indian Railways depending on demand.

Service

The 12843/44 Puri–Ahmedabad Express covers the distance of 2130 kilometres in 37 hours 55 mins as 12843 Puri–Ahmedabad Express (56.18 km/hr) & in 38 hrs 55 mins as 12844 Ahmedabad–Puri Express (54.73 km/hr).

As the average speed of the train is above 55 km/hr, as per Indian Railways rules, its fare includes a Superfast surcharge.

Routeing

Traction

This route is fully electrified and it is hauled by a Vadodara-based WAP-7 locomotive on its entire journey.

Timings

 12843 Puri–Ahmedabad Express leaves Puri every Tuesday, Thursday, Friday & Saturday at 17:30 hrs IST and reaches Ahmedabad Junction at 07:25 hrs IST on the 3rd day.
 12844 Ahmedabad–Puri Express leaves Ahmedabad Junction every Monday, Thursday, Saturday & Sunday at 18:40 hrs IST and reaches Puri at 08:55 hrs IST on the 3rd day.

References

External links

Transport in Ahmedabad
Transport in Puri
Express trains in India
Rail transport in Odisha
Rail transport in Telangana
Rail transport in Chhattisgarh
Rail transport in Maharashtra
Rail transport in Gujarat